Sociedad Deportiva Tarazona is a Spanish football team based in Tarazona, in the autonomous community of Aragon. Founded in 1969, it plays in Segunda División RFEF – Group 3, holding home games at Municipal, with a 1,500-seat capacity.

History 
The club was founded in 1969 as Club de Fútbol Eureka, being renamed to Club Recreativo Cultural Eureka in 1973 and Club de Fútbol Eureka-Tarazona in 1975. In 1977, it changed to its current name Sociedad Deportiva Tarazona.

The club became champion of the Tercera División, Group 17 in the 2018-19 season.

Season to season

 As C. R. C. Eureka

 As S. D. Tarazona

1 season in Segunda División B
2 seasons in Segunda División RFEF
21 seasons in Tercera División

Current squad

References

External links
Futbolme team profile 

Football clubs in Aragon
Tarazona
Association football clubs established in 1969
1969 establishments in Spain